Karakaya is a village in the Baykan District of Siirt Province in Turkey. The village is populated by Kurds of the Babosî tribe and had a population of 776 in 2021.

The hamlet of Eğridal is attached to Karakaya.

References 

Kurdish settlements in Siirt Province
Villages in Baykan District